Peter Strasser may refer to:

Peter Strasser (1876-1918), a German aviation leader in World War I
Peter Strasser (chemist) (born 1969), a German chemist
Peter G. Strasser, an American lawyer